Arachidicoccus ginsenosidivorans is a Gram-negative, aerobic and non-motile bacterium from the genus of Arachidicoccus which has been isolated from soil from a ginseng field from Pocheon in Korea.

References

External links
Type strain of Arachidicoccus ginsenosidivorans at BacDive -  the Bacterial Diversity Metadatabase

Further reading 
 

Chitinophagia
Bacteria described in 2017